Misr International University (MIU) is a private research university in Obour, Greater Cairo, Egypt. The university offers a unique educational experience in which both Egyptian and Western system are merged, enabling the university to continuously upgrade by developing new courses, and applying the latest educational methodologies.

MIU is considered to be one of Egypt's finest private universities dedicated to providing for the intellectual, professional, and creative development of their students.

History 
Misr International University was founded in 1996 by the former President of Egypt, Hosni Mubarak in accordance with the presidential decree no. 246 with the purpose of developing an academic institution that would directly and honestly address the practical realities of the 21st century. The university has been a member of the Arab Universities Association since March 1997.

Faculties
 Faculty of Al-Alsun and Mass Communication
 Faculty of Business Administration and International Trade
 Faculty of Computer Science
 Faculty of Engineering Sciences & Arts
 Faculty of Oral and Dental Medicine
 Faculty of Pharmacy

Notable alumni 

 Lamia bint Majed Al Saud - Secretary General of Alwaleed Philanthropies
 Salma Abu-Deif - Actress

See also 
 List of Egyptian universities

External links 
 MIU home page

 
International universities
Educational institutions established in 1996
1996 establishments in Egypt
Universities in Egypt